The 2 AM Club is a popular bar in Mill Valley, California. It is known as being the location of the cover photo of the Huey Lewis and the News' album Sports. Known locally as "The Deuce", it is a popular watering hole.

It was formerly known as "The Brown Jug", which was opened by Bill Brown on the corner of Miller and Montford. Prohibition caused its closure in 1921. It reopened in 1933  with the same name by Joe Hornsby, but became known as 2 A.M. Club. This was because it was outside of the city limits and therefore allowed to stay open until 2 A.M, whereas bars within the city of Mill Valley had to close at 10 pm. It became officially renamed as the 2 A.M. Club in 1940.

The "toilet seat" guitar created by Charlie Deal still hangs behind the bar. Deal holds the patent for the idea and transformed numerous donated, oak seats into musical instruments.

The band "2AM Club" named themselves after the bar.

References

Buildings and structures in Marin County, California
Drinking establishments in the San Francisco Bay Area
Mill Valley, California